Leroy "Pete" Litscher (January 15, 1922 – October 15, 2000) was an American farmer  and politician.

Born in the Town of Troy, Sauk County, Wisconsin, he graduated from Prairie du Sac High School and was a dairy farmer. He was involved with the Wisconsin Farmers Union and the Baraboo Dairy Producers. Litscher served on the Lower Narrows and Baraboo School Boards. He also served on the Sauk County Board of Supervisors and was a Democrat. In 1975, Wisconsin Governor Patrick Lucey appointed Litscher to the Wisconsin Cable Television Study Commission. Litscher was elected to the Wisconsin State Assembly in a November special election 1975 and was reelected in 1976 serving until 1979. He died in Baraboo, Wisconsin.

Notes

1922 births
2000 deaths
People from Sauk County, Wisconsin
Farmers from Wisconsin
School board members in Wisconsin
County supervisors in Wisconsin
20th-century American businesspeople
20th-century American politicians
Democratic Party members of the Wisconsin State Assembly